Newbiggin is a small hamlet in Cumbria, England. Cumrew beck flows north-west through Newbiggin eventually joining the Eden close to Armathwaite. The village contains many houses of a traditional design, a historic chapel (now a private home) and several large acreage farms. On the fells around the village there are traces of the old mines that used to operate in the area, as well as the skeletons of Lime kiln. A track from the village leads up to new water river, which can be followed north to Castle Carrock. There is a pub, The Blue Bell Inn.

See also

Listed buildings in Ainstable

External links
  Cumbria County History Trust: Croglin (nb: provisional research only - see Talk page)

Hamlets in Cumbria
Ainstable
Lime kilns in England